Deergha Sumangali (Kannada: ದೀರ್ಘ ಸುಮಂಗಲಿ) is a 1995 Indian Kannada film, directed by D. Rajendra Babu and produced by D. R. Umashankari and R. Venkata Raju. The film stars Sithara, Devan, Srinivasa Murthy and B. V. Radha. The film had musical score by Hamsalekha.

Cast

Vishnuvardhan in Guest Appearance
Sithara
Devan
Srinivasa Murthy
B. V. Radha
Lakshman
Richard Louis
Ramakrishna
Srishailan
M. S. Karanth
Brahmavar

Music
"Kaviya Samaya" - S. Janaki, S. P. Balasubrahmanyam
"Naanu Ninnannu" - Mano
"Bhumige Devaru" - Mano
"Baila Baila" - S. Janaki
"Chandra Manchake" - K. S. Chithra, S. P. Balasubrahmanyam
"Thavarondu Chinthe" - S. P. Balasubrahmanyam

References

External links
 

1990s Kannada-language films
Films scored by Hamsalekha
Films directed by D. Rajendra Babu